National Route 1 (N1) is a national highway of Morocco. It connects Guerguerat in the south near the border with Mauritania  to Tangier on the northwest coast of Morocco. It is an important highway running along the western Atlantic coast of the country. It passes through Rabat, Larache and other important cities and for a substantial part of the Rabat-Tangier leg runs parallel with the A1 Rabat–Tangier expressway. It is the longest national motorway in the country.

Between Tan-Tan and Tarfaya, the route runs through Khenifiss National Park.

National Route 1 is a part of a major transport corridor which runs from Morocco via Mauritania to Dakar in Senegal.

References

Roads in Morocco